Sarupathar Bengali is a census town in Dibrugarh district in the Indian state of Assam.

Demographics
At the 2001 India census, Sarupathar Bengali had a population of 6607. Males constitute 55% of the population and females 45%. Sarupathar Bengali has an average literacy rate of 78%, higher than the national average of 59.5%: male literacy is 82%, and female literacy is 74%. In Sarupathar Bengali, 12% of the population is under 6 years of age.

Cities and towns in Dibrugarh district
Dibrugarh